Herman Bodek (Tzvi Hirsh Bodek; 27 September 1820, Brody – 19 August 1880, Leipzig) was a Galician Jewish Hebraist. He was descended from a highly respected family, and was the son-in-law of Solomon Judah Loeb Rapoport. For a long time he lived in Leipzig, where he was translator of Hebrew at the courts of law, and was also engaged in business.

Bodek was well acquainted with rabbinical and Maskilic Hebrew literature, and contributed articles on various subjects to the Jewish periodical press of several countries. He was the author of Eleh dibre ha-berit (Leipzig, 1880), a twelve-chapter introduction to the ritual signs, allegories, and objects of Freemasonry.

References
 

1820 births
1880 deaths
Jews from Galicia (Eastern Europe)
People from the Kingdom of Galicia and Lodomeria
People from Brody
Writers from Leipzig
Hebrew-language writers
Freemasons
Austrian Empire emigrants to Germany